Rødungen is a lake in Viken County, Norway. The lake is located on the border between the municipalities of Ål and Nore og Uvdal.
Waterfall from the lake is a power source for Usta kraftverk, a hydro-electric plant. The power station exploits the fall of the Usta River from Rødungen as well as Ustevatn. The plant started production in 1965 and is owned and operated by E- CO Energi.

References

External links
E-CO Energi website

Lakes of Viken (county)